Central Waqf Council, India  is an Indian statutory body established in 1964 by the Government of India under the Waqf Act, 1954 (now a subsection of the Waqf Act, 1995) for the purpose of advising it on matters pertaining to the working of the State Waqf Boards and proper administration of the Waqfs in the country. Waqf is a permanent dedication of movable or immovable properties for  religious, pious or charitable purposes as recognized by Muslim Law, given by philanthropists. The grant is known as mushrut-ul-khidmat, while a person making such dedication is known as Wakif.

The Council
Central Waqf Council is a statutory body under the administrative control of the Ministry of Minority Affairs was set up in 1964 as per the provision given in the Waqf Act, 1954 as Advisory Body to the Central Government on matters concerning the working of the Waqf Boards and the due administration of Auqaf.

State Waqf Boards
The State Waqf Boards are established by the State Governments in view of the provisions of Section 9(1) of the Waqf Act, 1954. These work towards management, regulation and protect the Waqf properties by constituting District Waqf Committees, Mandal Waqf Committees and Committees for the individual Waqf Institutions. The Waqf Boards shall be body corporate having perpetual succession and a common seal with power to acquire and hold property. In the case that more than fifteen per cent of the total number of waqf property is Shia waqf, or the income thereof is more than fifteen per cent, the Act envisages a separate Shia Waqf Board.   
Andhra Pradesh Waqf Board
 Assam Wakf Board
 Bihar Sunni and Shia Wakf Board
 Chhattisgarh Wakf Board
 Delhi Wakf Board
 Gujarat Wakf Board
 Haryana Waqf Board
 Himachal Wakf Board
 Jharkhand Wakf Board
 Karnataka Wakf Board
 Kerala Wakf Board
 Madhya Pradesh Wakf Board
 Maharashtra State Board of Waqfs
 Manipur Wakf Board
 Meghalaya Wakf Board
 Odisha Wakf Board
 Punjab Wakf Board
 Rajasthan Board of Muslim Wakfs
 Tamilnadu Wakf Board
 Tripura Wakf Board
 Telangana Waqf Board
 Uttarakhand Wakf Board
 Uttar Pradesh Sunni Central Waqf Board; Shia Wakf Board
 West Bengal Wakf Board
 Andaman Nicobar Wakf Board
 Chandigarh Wakf Board
 Laxdweep Wakf Board
 Dadra & Nagar Haveli Wakf Board
 Puducherry Wakf Board
Presently there are thirty Wakf Boards across the country in twenty-eight states and Union territories. States such as Goa, Arunachal Pradesh, Mizoram, Nagaland and Sikkim and the Union Territory Daman and Diu have no Wakf Board at present. The Waqf Act 1995 is not applicable to Jammu and Kashmir.

Justice Shashvat Kumar, who headed the Shashvat Committee has prepared a status report on Muslims in India in 2011 and the finding of this report was that Nationwide, Wakf properties constitute a land bank worth Rs. 1.2 lakh crore and could have generated annual returns of Rs. 12,000 crores but yielded only Rs. 163 crores and found that there was "a severe shortage of senior government officers who are Muslim to manage wakf affairs. A separate cadre would mean officers who are not only permanent but also qualified enough".

The Haryana Wakf Board (HWB) registered an all-time high income of Rs 17.03 crore during 2010–11, which is Rs 3.33 crore higher than the previous year. During 2010–11, the Board spent Rs 3.32 crore on various educational and welfare activities. The Board had earmarked Rs 6.47 crore in the budget for 2011–12 to meet the main objectives of wakfs and various educational and welfare activities, he said.

The central as well as state Wakf Boards have been involved in corruption, land encroachment, and misappropriation of funds. The Karnataka Wakf Board Land Scam is one such case.

Further reading
 Wakf administration in India: a socio-legal study, by Khalid Rashid. Vikas Pub., 1978. .

See also 
 Evacuee Trust Property Board
 Political integration of India
 Custodian for Enemy Property for India, for the government takeover of property of rulers who migrated to Pakistan
 Enemy Property Act, 1968, the basis of Custodian for Enemy Property for India
 Privy Purse in India

References

External links
 Central Waqf Council, Official website
 Delhi Wakf Board
 Karnataka Wakf Board
 Kerala Wakf Board
 Maharashtra State Board of Waqfs
 Tamilnadu Wakf Board

Islam in India
Government agencies established in 1964
Organisations based in Delhi
Wakf